Zhang Chenglong (born May 12, 1989) is a Chinese gymnast.

He competed for the national team at the 2012 Summer Olympics in the Men's artistic team all-around and helped win the team gold medal.

World Championships and Asian Games

At both the 2010 World Artistic Gymnastics Championships, in Rotterdam, and 2010 Asian Games, in Guangzhou, Zhang won gold with the Chinese Team, and was able to also win gold at the horizontal bar, in both international events, and gold at the floor exercise.  Zou Kai, the Olympic and World Champion in these events was left out of the team that year.

At the 2011 World Artistic Gymnastics Championships, in Tokyo, he again won gold in the Team competition, but couldn't retain his title on the horizontal bar, finishing second in the final to Zou Kai, who recaptured his title in that event.  He also tied for second on parallel bars.

Summer Olympics
At the 2012 Summer Olympics, Zhang helped the Chinese team win the gold medal in the Men's artistic team all-around. He also competed in event finals of horizontal bar and parallel bars but finished off the podium in both events.

At the 2016 Olympics, he was part of the Chinese team that won bronze in the men's team event.

See also
 China at the 2012 Summer Olympics

References

External links
 
 

1989 births
Living people
Sportspeople from Zibo
Gymnasts from Shandong
Chinese male artistic gymnasts
Olympic gymnasts of China
Olympic medalists in gymnastics
Olympic gold medalists for China
Gymnasts at the 2012 Summer Olympics
Gymnasts at the 2016 Summer Olympics
Medalists at the 2012 Summer Olympics
2016 Olympic bronze medalists for China
Medalists at the World Artistic Gymnastics Championships
Gymnasts at the 2010 Asian Games
Asian Games medalists in gymnastics
Asian Games gold medalists for China
Medalists at the 2010 Asian Games
21st-century Chinese people